Colegio Tecnico Comercial Santa Maria Goretty is a technical school located in downtown Cali in Colombia.

It started as a small primary school and has become a high school technical with accounting specialization. It takes its name from Maria Goretti (16 October 1890 – 6 July 1902), an Italian virgin-martyr of the Roman Catholic Church.

Schools in Colombia